Rev. Joshua Vaughan House is a historic home located in East Fallowfield Township, Chester County, Pennsylvania. It was built in 1796, and is a two-story, three-bay, stuccoed stone dwelling with a gable roof.  It is representative of an English Colonial farmhouse.

It was added to the National Register of Historic Places in 1985.

References

Houses on the National Register of Historic Places in Pennsylvania
Houses completed in 1796
Houses in Chester County, Pennsylvania
National Register of Historic Places in Chester County, Pennsylvania
1796 establishments in Pennsylvania